ISCR may refer to:

 Institute for Stem Cell Research at the University of Edinburgh, see Scottish Centre for Regenerative Medicine
 Ironwood Springs Christian Ranch, Stewartville, Minnesota, United States
 Istituto Superiore per la Conservazione ed il Restauro, Rome
 Institute for Scientific Computing Research, part of the Lawrence Livermore National Laboratory
 In situ chemical reduction,  an environmental remediation technique